The arrondissement of Dunkirk is an arrondissement of France in the Nord department in the Hauts-de-France region. It has 111 communes.

It roughly corresponds to the French Westhoek (part of French Flanders), where traditionally French Flemish is spoken.

Composition

The communes of the arrondissement of Dunkirk, and their INSEE codes, are:
 
 Armbouts-Cappel (59016)
 Arnèke (59018)
 Bailleul (59043)
 Bambecque (59046)
 Bavinchove (59054)
 Bergues (59067)
 Berthen (59073)
 Bierne (59082)
 Bissezeele (59083)
 Blaringhem (59084)
 Boeschepe (59086)
 Boëseghem (59087)
 Bollezeele (59089)
 Borre (59091)
 Bourbourg (59094)
 Bray-Dunes (59107)
 Brouckerque (59110)
 Broxeele (59111)
 Buysscheure (59119)
 Caëstre (59120)
 Cappelle-Brouck (59130)
 Cappelle-la-Grande (59131)
 Cassel (59135)
 Coudekerque-Branche (59155)
 Craywick (59159)
 Crochte (59162)
 Le Doulieu (59180)
 Drincham (59182)
 Dunkerque (59183)
 Ebblinghem (59184)
 Eecke (59189)
 Eringhem (59200)
 Esquelbecq (59210)
 Estaires (59212)
 Flêtre (59237)
 Ghyvelde (59260)
 Godewaersvelde (59262)
 La Gorgue (59268)
 Grand-Fort-Philippe (59272)
 Grande-Synthe (59271)
 Gravelines (59273)
 Hardifort (59282)
 Haverskerque (59293)
 Hazebrouck (59295)
 Herzeele (59305)
 Holque (59307)
 Hondeghem (59308)
 Hondschoote (59309)
 Houtkerque (59318)
 Hoymille (59319)
 Killem (59326)
 Lederzeele (59337)
 Ledringhem (59338)
 Leffrinckoucke (59340)
 Looberghe (59358)
 Loon-Plage (59359)
 Lynde (59366)
 Merckeghem (59397)
 Merris (59399)
 Merville (59400)
 Méteren (59401)
 Millam (59402)
 Morbecque (59416)
 Neuf-Berquin (59423)
 Nieppe (59431)
 Nieurlet (59433)
 Noordpeene (59436)
 Ochtezeele (59443)
 Oost-Cappel (59448)
 Oudezeele (59453)
 Oxelaëre (59454)
 Pitgam (59463)
 Pradelles (59469)
 Quaëdypre (59478)
 Renescure (59497)
 Rexpoëde (59499)
 Rubrouck (59516)
 Saint-Georges-sur-l'Aa (59532)
 Sainte-Marie-Cappel (59536)
 Saint-Jans-Cappel (59535)
 Saint-Momelin (59538)
 Saint-Pierre-Brouck (59539)
 Saint-Sylvestre-Cappel (59546)
 Sercus (59568)
 Socx (59570)
 Spycker (59576)
 Staple (59577)
 Steenbecque (59578)
 Steene (59579)
 Steenvoorde (59580)
 Steenwerck (59581)
 Strazeele (59582)
 Terdeghem (59587)
 Téteghem-Coudekerque-Village (59588)
 Thiennes (59590)
 Uxem (59605)
 Vieux-Berquin (59615)
 Volckerinckhove (59628)
 Wallon-Cappel (59634)
 Warhem (59641)
 Watten (59647)
 Wemaers-Cappel (59655)
 West-Cappel (59657)
 Winnezeele (59662)
 Wormhout (59663)
 Wulverdinghe (59664)
 Wylder (59665)
 Zegerscappel (59666)
 Zermezeele (59667)
 Zuydcoote (59668)
 Zuytpeene (59669)

History

The arrondissement of Bergues was created in 1800. The subprefecture was moved to Dunkirk in 1803.

As a result of the reorganisation of the cantons of France which came into effect in 2015, the borders of the cantons are no longer related to the borders of the arrondissements. The cantons of the arrondissement of Dunkirk were, as of January 2015:

 Bailleul-Nord-Est
 Bailleul-Sud-Ouest
 Bergues
 Bourbourg
 Cassel
 Coudekerque-Branche
 Dunkerque-Est
 Dunkerque-Ouest
 Grande-Synthe
 Gravelines
 Hazebrouck-Nord
 Hazebrouck-Sud
 Hondschoote
 Merville
 Steenvoorde
 Wormhout

References

Dunkerque
French Flanders